Sainbu is a village development committee in Lalitpur District in the Bagmati Zone of central Nepal. At the time of the 1991 Nepal census it had a population of 4612 living in 874 individual households.

References

External links
UN map of the municipalities of Lalitpur District

In Sainbu Loo Niva Child concern is actively working for the betterment of Southern Lalitpur VDCs

Populated places in Lalitpur District, Nepal